Decadiomus is a genus of lady beetles in the  family Coccinellidae. There are about six described species in Decadiomus. They are found primarily in the Caribbean, but Decadiomus bahamicus is also found in southern Florida.

Species
These six species belong to the genus Decadiomus:
 Decadiomus bahamicus (Casey, 1899)
 Decadiomus hubbardi Chapin
 Decadiomus hughesi Gordon & Hilburn
 Decadiomus peltatus Chapin
 Decadiomus pictus Chapin
 Decadiomus tricuspis Chapin

References

Further reading

 

Coccinellidae
Coccinellidae genera